The River Allow is a river in Ireland, flowing through County Limerick and County Cork.

Course
The Allow rises in the Mullaghareirk Mountains and forms part of the County Limerick–County Cork border before flowing eastwards, passing under the R579 and meeting a tributary near Freemount, passing under the R578 and continuing southward to Kanturk where it meets the River Dalua. The Allow then flows southwards, passing under the N72 at Leader's Bridge and enters the Munster Blackwater at Ballymaquirk/Dromcummer Beg.

Wildlife
The River Allow is a salmon fishery.

See also
Rivers of Ireland

References

Rivers of County Cork
Rivers of County Limerick